Age of Nemesis is a Hungarian progressive metal band that formed in 1997 as Nemesis and later changed their name to Age of Nemesis in 2005. They are heavily influenced by Dream Theater and Symphony X. They released their albums in English and in Hungarian on different dates.

Discography

Discography as Age of Nemesis
 Nemesis (1998)
 Eden? (2002) (English)
 Psychogeist (2006) (English)
 Terra Incognita (2007) (English)

Discography as Nemesis
 Nemesis (1998) (Hungarian)
 Abraxas (1999) (Hungarian)
 Eden?
 For Promotional Use Only (2001) (Hungarian)
 Terra Incognita (2002) (Hungarian)
 Terra Incognita (2003) (English)
 For Promotional Use Only II (2005) (Hungarian)

Band line-up

Current members
 Zoltán Kiss - Main vocals, rhythm guitars
 Zoltán Fábián - Guitars
 György Nagy - Keyboards
 György Tolmacsov - Bass
 Gábor Krecsmarik - Drums backing vocals

Former members
 Ákos Thorday - vocals (deceased)
 György Pethe - bass
 Mihály Szerecsen - drums
 Laszlo Nagy - drums

External links
 Age of Nemesis' official website
 Magna Carta (record label) website

Hungarian heavy metal musical groups
Progressive metal musical groups
Musical groups established in 1997
Musical quintets
Magna Carta Records artists